Cophixalus montanus is a species of frog in the family Microhylidae. It is endemic to Halmahera in the Maluku Islands, Indonesia; record from New Guinea was based on misidentification.

Its natural habitat is unknown but presumably is rainforest.

References

montanus
Amphibians of Indonesia
Endemic fauna of Indonesia
Fauna of Halmahera
Taxonomy articles created by Polbot
Amphibians described in 1895